Kim Doo-kwan (RR: Gim Du-gwan, Hanja: 金斗官; born 10 April 1959) is a South Korean Democratic United Party politician, former civil servant, and former governor of South Gyeongsang Province. He was elected governor in the 2010 local elections as an independent after two previous unsuccessful attempts. He served as Minister for Home Affairs under the administration of Roh Moo-hyun, and at one point was seen as a potential contender for the DUP nomination in the 2012 presidential election.

Early life and education

Kim Doo-kwan was born in a village in Namhae on 10 April 1959. He studied at the Department of Political Diplomacy of Dong-A University, graduating in 1987.

Political career

After serving as Secretary-General of the Namhae farmers' association from 1987, Kim was prefect of Namhae County in the 1990s. He failed in a bid to become governor of South Gyeongsang in 2002. In 2003, he was chosen as Minister for Government Administration and Home Affairs by Roh Moo-hyun, but on 3 September of that year the National Assembly voted to dismiss him. He unsuccessfully contested Namhae in the 2004 National Assembly elections for the Uri Party, winning 16.9% of the vote. He subsequently lost a second attempt to become governor in 2006.

Governorship

In the 2010 local elections, Kim won an upset victory in the South Gyeongsang gubernatorial election as an independent candidate, and took office as governor on 1 July 2010. Despite originally promising to maintain his independence, in February 2011 he joined the Democratic United Party.

Party politics

After the party's defeat in the 2012 parliamentary elections, Kim emerged as an alternative candidate for the DUP nomination for that year's presidential election, though he had been considered as a potential frontrunner beforehand. He has been termed the "little Roh Moo-hyun" on account of his unprivileged background and his principles.

References

1959 births
Living people
People from Namhae County
Members of the National Assembly (South Korea)
Minjoo Party of Korea politicians
People from South Gyeongsang Province
Governors of South Gyeongsang Province
South Korean Buddhists
Dong-a University alumni